Back to the Web is the eighth album by the indie rock band Elf Power.  It was released on Rykodisc in April 2006.

Track listing
"Come Lie Down With Me (And Sing My Song)" – 2:17
"An Old Familiar Scene" – 4:13
"Rolling Black Water" – 2:32
"King of Earth" – 3:03
"Peel Back the Moon, Beware!" – 3:34
"23rd Dream" – 2:08
"Somewhere Down the River" – 4:11
"The Spider and the Fly" – 3:17
"Forming" – 1:47
"All the World Is Waiting" – 3:04
"Under the Northern Sky" – 1:32
"Back to the Web" – 3:33

References

Elf Power albums
Rykodisc albums
2006 albums